"Closer/Sweet Dreams" is the second single from Nylon. It was a number-one hit in Iceland.

Track listings

CD1
Closer - 3.33
Sweet Dreams [Uniting Nations Radio Edit] - 3.07

CD2
Closer - 3.33
Sweet Dreams - 3.41
Sweet Dreams [K-Klub Vocal Mix] - 7.24
 Closer [Video]

Promos

Sweet Dreams

United Nations Extended Mix - 7.00
K-Klub Vocal Mix - 7.24
Original Radio Edit - 3.43
United Nations Radio Edit - 3.08
K-Klub Radio Edit - 4.05

Videos
 Closer on Youtube
 Sweet Dreams on Youtube

External links
 Nylon Official Site

2006 singles
Nylon (band) songs
2006 songs
Song articles with missing songwriters